The 1964 Auburn Tigers football team represented Auburn University in the 1964 NCAA University Division football season. It was the Tigers' 73rd overall and 31st season as a member of the Southeastern Conference (SEC). The team was led by head coach Ralph "Shug" Jordan, in his 14th year, and played their home games at Cliff Hare Stadium in Auburn and Legion Field in Birmingham, Alabama. They finished with a record of six wins and four losses (6–4 overall, 3–3 in the SEC).

Schedule

Source: 1964 Auburn football schedule

Roster
Tucker Frederickson

References

Auburn
Auburn Tigers football seasons
Auburn Tigers football